Eloyella is a genus of flowering plants from the orchid family, Orchidaceae. It contains 10 known species, native to Panama and to northern South America:

Eloyella antioquiensis (P.Ortiz) P.Ortiz - Colombia
Eloyella bifida D.E.Benn. & Christenson - Peru
Eloyella cundinamarcae (P.Ortiz) P.Ortiz - Colombia
Eloyella dalstroemii Dodson - Ecuador 
Eloyella jostii Dodson & Dalström - Ecuador 
Eloyella mendietae Dodson & L.Jost - Ecuador 
Eloyella panamensis (Dressler) Dodson - Panama, Colombia, Venezuela, Guyana, Ecuador
Eloyella thienii Dodson - Ecuador 
Eloyella thivii Senghas - Bolivia
Eloyella werneri Dodson & Dalström - Ecuador

See also 
 List of Orchidaceae genera

References 

 Pridgeon, A.M., Cribb, P.J., Chase, M.A. & Rasmussen, F. eds. (1999). Genera Orchidacearum 1. Oxford Univ. Press.
 Pridgeon, A.M., Cribb, P.J., Chase, M.A. & Rasmussen, F. eds. (2001). Genera Orchidacearum 2. Oxford Univ. Press.
 Pridgeon, A.M., Cribb, P.J., Chase, M.A. & Rasmussen, F. eds. (2003). Genera Orchidacearum 3. Oxford Univ. Press
 Berg Pana, H. 2005. Handbuch der Orchideen-Namen. Dictionary of Orchid Names. Dizionario dei nomi delle orchidee. Ulmer, Stuttgart

External links 

Oncidiinae genera
Oncidiinae